The 2014 UST Growling Tigers men's basketball team represented University of Santo Tomas in the 77th season of the University Athletic Association of the Philippines. The men's basketball tournament for the school year 2014-15 began on July 12, 2014 and the host school for the season was University of the East.

UST finished sixth at the end of the double round-robin eliminations with five games against nine losses. They had an average losing margin of 9.2 points and an average winning margin of 6.6 points per game.

The Tigers failed to qualify to the Final Four for the first time since Season 73 and after being in back-to-back Finals appearances the past two years.

Cameroonian center Karim Abdul made it to the Mythical team selection for the third straight year.

Roster

Depth chart

Roster changes

Subtractions

Additions

Recruiting class

Coaching changes 
Bong dela Cruz replaced Pido Jarencio as the head coach of the Growling Tigers senior men's basketball team on March 27, 2014. The coaching change was announced by Institute of Physical Education and Athletics (IPEA) secretary and UAAP board representative Ms. Gilda Kamus following Jarencio's resignation in January.

Jarencio, the Growling Tigers coach for eight years who led the team to the UAAP title in his rookie year in 2006, signed a two-year contract as head coach of GlobalPort in the Philippine Basketball Association.

Dela Cruz was a point guard of the Glowing Goldies in 1988 before he transferred to the Adamson Falcons to join former high school teammates Giovanni Pineda, Gerardo Hipolito, Manuel Cucio, Marlou Aquino, and Christopher de Leon. Together with EJ Feihl, the Golden Nuggets juniors team was once regarded as the tallest basketball team in the country.

After his college playing days, he became a coach in the Philippine Basketball League, the National Basketball Conference, and Liga Pilipinas. He was hired as an assistant coach of the Growling Tigers beginning in Season 75. Aside from UST, he was also an assistant coach for the Enderun Titans under former FEU Tamaraws player Pipo Noundou.

Injuries 
Fourth year forward Kevin Ferrer's season was cut short after only eight games after fracturing his left hand during practice prior to their second-round match against the FEU Tamaraws.

Karim Abdul missed their game against the UE Red Warriors in the first round after being confined in the hospital from dehydration due to a viral infection.

Schedule and results

Preseason tournaments

UAAP games 

Elimination games were played in a double round-robin format. All games were aired on ABS-CBN Sports and Action.

Notes

UAAP statistics 

|- bgcolor=#ffffdd
| Karim Abdul || 13 || 12 || style=|30.0 || 61 || 139 || 43.9% || 0 || 5 || 0.0% || 65 || 90 || 72.2% || style=|9.2 || 1.5 || 1.2 || style=|1.7 || 3.8 || style=|14.4
|-
| Aljon Mariano || 14 || 9 || 26.7 || 57 || 167 || 34.1% || 13 || 42 || 31.0% || 27 || 40 || 67.5% || 5.5 || 1.4 || 0.5 || 0.2 || 2.7 || 11.0
|- bgcolor=#ffffdd
| Louie Vigil || 13 || 10 || 26.5 || 49 || 133 || 36.8% || 13 || 60 || 21.7% || 25 || 44 || 56.8% || 4.2 || 2.1 || 0.4 || 0.5 || 2.4 || 10.5
|-
| Kevin Ferrer || 8 || 6 || 28.2 || 22 || 91 || 24.2% || 8 || 46 || 17.4% || 25 || 31 || style=|80.6% || 5.3 || 1.4 || 1.0 || 0.3 || 2.6 || 9.6
|- bgcolor=#ffffdd
| Ed Daquioag || 12 || 7 || 22.5 || 32 || 91 || 35.2% || 8 || 38 || 21.1% || 14 || 19 || 73.7% || 2.6 || 1.5 || 1.3 || 0.4 || 2.4 || 7.2
|-
| Jon Sheriff || 14 || 13 || 24.7 || 27 || 62 || 43.5% || 0 || 2 || 0.0% || 4 || 8 || 50.0% || 4.1 || style=|2.5 || style=|1.6 || 0.0 || 2.4 || 4.1
|- bgcolor=#ffffdd
| Kent Lao || 13 || 10 || 14.0 || 17 || 41 || 41.5% || 6 || 22 || 27.3% || 6 || 12 || 50.0% || 2.0 || 0.4 || 0.0 || 0.2 || 0.5 || 3.5
|-
| Renzo Subido || 14 || 0 || 16.5 || 15 || 52 || 28.8% || 9 || 34 || 26.5% || 8 || 11 || 72.7% || 1.5 || 1.0 || 0.5 || 0.0 || 0.9 || 3.4
|- bgcolor=#ffffdd
| Regie Boy Basibas || 10 || 0 || 8.8 || 8 || 18 || style=|44.4% || 1 || 2 || style=|50.0% || 6 || 13 || 46.2% || 2.9 || 0.4 || 0.1 || 0.1 || 0.8 || 2.3
|-
| Jeepy Faundo || 4 || 0 || 6.8 || 1 || 5 || 20.0% || 0 || 0 || 0.0% || 5 || 6 || 83.3% || 2.0 || 0.0 || 0.0 || 0.3 || 0.0 || 1.8
|- bgcolor=#ffffdd
| Paolo Pe || 14 || 2 || 9.0 || 9 || 23 || 39.1% || 0 || 0 || 0.0% || 2 || 8 || 25.0% || 1.6 || 0.0 || 0.0 || 0.2 || 0.2 || 1.4
|-
| Kim Lo || 14 || 1 || 8.8 || 8 || 31 || 25.8% || 0 || 9 || 0.0% || 4 || 10 || 40.0% || 1.7 || 0.9 || 0.1 || 0.0 || 0.6 || 1.4
|- bgcolor=#ffffdd
| Alfren Gayosa || 10 || 0 || 4.9 || 3 || 10 || 30.0% || 1 || 5 || 20.0% || 5 || 11 || 45.5% || 1.2 || 0.1 || 0.2 || 0.1 || 0.6 || 1.2
|-
| Joco Macasaet || 5 || 0 || 1.4 || 0 || 0 || 0.0% || 0 || 0 || 0.0% || 0 || 0 || 0.0% || 0.2 || 0.0 || 0.0 || 0.0 || 0.0 || 0.0
|- bgcolor=#ffffdd
| Levi dela Cruz || 4 || 0 || 2.8 || 0 || 2 || 0.0% || 0 || 2 || 0.0% || 0 || 0 || 0.0% || 0.0 || 0.3 || 0.0 || 0.0 || 0.3 || 0.0
|-
| Gelo Sablan || 2 || 0 || 2.0 || 0 || 1 || 0.0% || 0 || 1 || 0.0% || 0 || 0 || 0.0% || 1.0 || 0.0 || 0.0 || 0.0 || 0.0 || 0.0
|- class=sortbottom
! Total || 14 ||  || 40.0 || 309 || 866 || 35.7% || 59 || 268 || 22.0% || 196 || 303 || 64.7% || 39.2 || 12.0 || 6.1 || 3.4 || 18.1 || 62.4
|- class=sortbottom
! Opponents || 14 ||  || 40.0 || 329 || 830 || 39.6% || 66 || 262 || 25.2% || 205 || 309 || 66.3% || 41.1 || 13.1 || 4.1 || 1.7 || 19.8 || 66.4
|}

Source: HumbleBola

Awards

Players drafted into the PBA 
Aljon Mariano was picked 16th overall in the second round of the 2015 PBA draft by the Tim Cone-led Barangay Ginebra San Miguel team on August 23, 2015.

References 

UST Growling Tigers
UST Growling Tigers basketball team seasons